Gonzalo Moreno Arévalo (born 21 August 1958) is a Mexican politician affiliated with the Institutional Revolutionary Party. As of 2014 he served as Deputy of the LIX Legislature of the Mexican Congress representing Jalisco.

References

1958 births
Living people
Politicians from Jalisco
Institutional Revolutionary Party politicians
University of Guadalajara alumni
21st-century Mexican politicians
Deputies of the LIX Legislature of Mexico
Members of the Chamber of Deputies (Mexico) for Jalisco